Paul O'Connor may refer to:

 Paul O'Connor (American football) (born 1962), American football player
 Paul O'Connor (Gaelic footballer), Irish Gaelic footballer
 Paul O'Connor (skier), Irish skier
 Paul O'Connor (hurler) (1963–2012), Irish hurler
 Paul O'Connor, see John F. Kennedy assassination conspiracy theories
 Paul O'Connor, founder of Trouble Brewing

See also 
 Paul Connor (disambiguation)